Andrew John Hintz (8 December 1963 – 7 February 2016) was a New Zealand first-class cricketer who played for Canterbury.

Born in Christchurch on 8 December 1963, Hintz played club cricket for Burnside West University. A right-arm pace bowler, Hintz made six first-class appearances for Canterbury between 1985/86 and 1987/88, taking 11 wickets at an average of 33.18. With the bat he scored 108 runs, with a high score of 62, at an average of 13.50. In 10 one-day games for Canterbury, he took 17 wickets at 21.11, and scored 60 runs at an average of 15.00.

Hintz died of cancer at Christchurch on 7 February 2016.

References

1963 births
2016 deaths
People from Christchurch
New Zealand cricketers
Canterbury cricketers
Deaths from cancer in New Zealand